XHHS-FM/XEHS-AM is a radio station on 90.9 FM and 540 AM in Los Mochis, Sinaloa, Mexico. It is owned by Radio Sistema del Noroeste and carries the La Mejor grupera format from MVS Radio.

History
XEHS-AM 1280 received its concession on November 16, 1957. The 250-watt station was owned by Benito L. Juárez, and in the 1960s, Juárez sold XEHS to Manuel Ceferino Pérez Alvarado. Control was soon after consolidated in a corporation. In the 1990s, XEHS moved to 540 kHz, enabling a daytime power increase to 5,000 watts and a nighttime bump to 2,500 watts. XHHS-FM was approved in 2010, and in 2015, XHHS-FM was authorized to increase power from 4 to 25 kW.

XEHS-AM remains on the air in a continuity obligation, to serve 27,552 people in its coverage area unserved by any other broadcast service.

References

Radio stations in Sinaloa
Radio stations in Mexico with continuity obligations